Jacqueline J. Mohr is an American marketing scholar and Regents Professor of Marketing and the Poe Family Distinguished Faculty Fellow at the University of Montana.

References 

American economists
University of Montana faculty
University of Wisconsin–Madison alumni
Marketing theorists

Living people

Year of birth missing (living people)